The 1957 St. Louis Cardinals season was the team's 76th season in St. Louis, Missouri and its 66th season in the National League. The Cardinals went 87–67 during the season and finished second in the National League, eight games behind the Milwaukee Braves.

Offseason 
 October 16, 1956: Hank Sauer was released by the Cardinals.
 November 27, 1956: Charlie Peete, 27, was killed in a plane crash, along with his wife and three children, while flying to Venezuela to play Winter League ball.  He was projected to be the Cardinals' starting center fielder in 1957.
 December 3, 1956: Bob Smith was drafted by the Cardinals from the Boston Red Sox in the 1956 rule 5 draft.
 December 11, 1956: Tom Poholsky, Jackie Collum, Ray Katt, and Wally Lammers (minors) were traded by the Cardinals to the Chicago Cubs for Eddie Miksis, Jim Davis, Sam Jones, and Hobie Landrith.
 February 26, 1957: Whitey Lockman was traded by the Cardinals to the New York Giants for Hoyt Wilhelm.
 Prior to 1957 season: Cal Browning was signed as an amateur free agent by the Cardinals.

Regular season

Season standings

Record vs. opponents

Notable transactions 
 April 20, 1957: Ed Mayer and Bobby Del Greco were traded by the Cardinals to the Chicago Cubs for Jim King.
 May 14, 1957: Bob Smith was purchased from the Cardinals by the Pittsburgh Pirates.
 September 19, 1957: Eddie Miksis was selected off waivers from the Cardinals by the Baltimore Orioles
 September 19, 1957: Morrie Martin was purchased by the Cardinals from the Baltimore Orioles.
 September 21, 1957: Hoyt Wilhelm was selected off waivers from the Cardinals by the Cleveland Indians.

Roster

Player stats

Batting

Starters by position 
Note: Pos = Position; G = Games played; AB = At bats; H = Hits; Avg. = Batting average; HR = Home runs; RBI = Runs batted in

Other batters 
Note: G = Games played; AB = At bats; H = Hits; Avg. = Batting average; HR = Home runs; RBI = Runs batted in

Pitching

Starting pitchers 
Note: G = Games pitched; IP = Innings pitched; W = Wins; L = Losses; ERA = Earned run average; SO = Strikeouts

Other pitchers 
Note: G = Games pitched; IP = Innings pitched; W = Wins; L = Losses; ERA = Earned run average; SO = Strikeouts

Relief pitchers 
Note: G = Games pitched; W = Wins; L = Losses; SV = Saves; ERA = Earned run average; SO = Strikeouts

Farm system 

LEAGUE CHAMPIONS: Houston, Winnipeg, Billings, Albany, Decatur, Ardmore

References

External links 
1957 St. Louis Cardinals at Baseball Reference
1957 St. Louis Cardinals team page at www.baseball-almanac.com

St. Louis Cardinals seasons
Saint Louis Cardinals season
1957 in sports in Missouri